is a series of action platform video games released by Capcom. It is a sub-series of the Mega Man franchise. The first game was released on December 17, 1993 in Japan on the Super Famicom and the following month on the SNES in North America; most of the sequels were ported to the PC platform. The gameplay introduced new elements to the Mega Man franchise including the ability to dash and climb walls. The first six games in the series were compiled in the anthology Mega Man X Collection.

Capcom released Mega Man X Legacy Collection 1 & 2 on July 24, 2018 and July 26, 2018 in Japan, for PlayStation 4, Xbox One, Nintendo Switch, and Windows, which contains all eight main games over both collections, as well as bonus modes.

Plot
"X" was created by Dr. Thomas Light. He was a new type of robot with the ability to think, feel, and make his own decisions. Recognizing the potential danger of this model (in particular if he were to break the first rule of robotics: a robot must never harm a human being), Light sealed X away in a diagnostic capsule for over 30 years of testing. X's capsule was uncovered by an archaeologist named Dr. Cain almost 100 years after X's creation. Excited by the possibilities X presented, Cain disregarded the warnings Light had logged in the capsule and created a legion of robots that replicated X's free will; these robots were called "Reploids" (shortened from Replica Android, but known as "Repliroids" in Japan).

A number of Reploids turned against humans. These Reploids were dubbed "Mavericks" ("Irregulars" in Japan), and a force called the Maverick Hunters ("Irregular Hunters") was formed to combat them. The Maverick Hunters were led by Sigma until he, too, became a Maverick and declared war against the humans, thus starting the Maverick War. X took it upon himself to join the Maverick Hunters under their new leader Zero. Throughout the series, X and Zero battle against the Mavericks to stop their plots to destroy the human race.

After the series reached an unresolved cliffhanger, a game entitled Mega Man X DiVE was released by Capcom Taiwan in which a human plays Mega Man X, until due in part to some corrupted data known as Maverick Data, he/she gets transported into the Deep Log, a massive database with data on every Mega Man game. The player must progress through the scrambled code of the Maverick Wars, Elf Wars, and the Game Of Destiny, to destroy the Maverick Data causing the slow corruption of the Deep Log.

Games

Cancelled games

Rockman X Interactive (1995—1996)
An interactive movie game known as Rockman X Interactive was in development between December 1995 and 1996; it would have featured several new characters and reportedly greatly influenced the direction of Super Adventure Rockman, another interactive movie which released in 1998. A copy of the design documents were once being sold on Yahoo! Auctions Japan, but were later taken down due to concerns about how the seller obtained them.

Maverick Hunter (2010)

In 2010, Armature Studio, a development studio founded by the creators of Metroid Prime, were developing a first-person shooter trilogy titled Maverick Hunter, which was intended to build on the mythology of Mega Man X. However, it was cancelled by Capcom after six months of development due to it being considered a "significant gamble" for the company. The game was one of the several cancelled Mega Man games of the 2010s, which also included Legends 3, Online, Universe and Star Force 4.

Rockman XZ: Time Rift (2020—2021)
Rockman XZ: Time Rift was first revealed in September 2020 on NebulaJoy's official website, which included the game's logo. It was a crossover game between the X and Zero series for mobile phones, in a similar vein to X DiVE. Shortly after footage of the game leaked online, it was announced that the title was cancelled in August due to the underperformance of Devil May Cry: Pillar of Combat.

Gameplay
Mega Man X plays similarly to its predecessor series Mega Man, but with various new features: X has, by default beginning with X2, the ability to dash along the ground, cling to walls, jump off walls, and dash jump to cover greater distance than a normal jump. This all gives X more mobility than his original series counterpart.

X is also able to locate capsules and tanks that permanently upgrade his armor. These upgrades are all either hidden or require an exceptional feat to reach. Upgrades common to each game are increased maximum hit points, "sub-tanks" which can be filled with surplus health pick-ups and then used at any time to refill the character's hit points, and the ability to charge weapons earned from bosses, which gives them an enhanced secondary fire mode. In later games, there are multiple armor types available that can either be mixed and matched, or completed for additional armor set bonuses.

Starting in X3, Zero is a playable character. In X3, Zero is armed with a beam saber in addition to the traditional "buster" arm cannon, but relies on his saber almost exclusively starting in X4. In X5, both X and Zero gain the ability to duck. In X6, the player can rescue reploids to replenish health and acquire upgrades not otherwise available. In X7, the playable character Axl is introduced. Axl utilizes two guns known as Axl Bullets. In X8, a tag system is introduced, along with a new Double Attack feature, where the two selected characters can attack at the same time.

Mavericks replace the Robot Masters, and Sigma replaces Dr. Wily. The stage boss Mavericks are based on various types of organisms (usually animals, but plants and fungi are also represented) instead of being humanoid, as were most of the bosses in the classic series, although their attacks and names are usually based on mechanical or chemical phenomena or laws of physics like in the original games. The main group of antagonists in each game, which are fought as mid-bosses and/or fortress bosses, are normally humanoid in appearance.

Other media

Animation
In Maverick Hunter X, the player can unlock an OVA called The Day of Sigma that details the events leading up to the first level, including Sigma turning Maverick; it was produced by Xebec (who also produced MegaMan NT Warrior and Mega Man Star Force) and later included in the Legacy Collection. Characters from the X series also appeared in the Mega Man animated series in the episode "Mega X", which was an pitch at an X cartoon that never got off the ground.

Print media

Several tie-in manga adaptations have been released, mainly serialized in Kodansha's children's magazine Comic BomBom, its quarterly special issues and its sister magazine Deluxe BomBom. An adaptation of the first four games in the series by Yoshihiro Iwamoto ran from 1994 to 1998 and was collected into 12 volumes. An original story featuring elements from the first Mega Man X game called Irregular Hunter Rockman X by Shigeto Ikehara ran from 1994 to 1995 and was collected into two volumes. The magazine also published several one-shots, including one based on the Mega Mission carddass series by Hitoshi Ariga and an original self-contained story called Team X Shutsujin seyo!! by Daisuke Inoue.

The character of X appeared in the obscure Brazilian comic Novas Aventuras de Mega Man (translated as The New Adventures of Mega Man), where he is Classic Mega Man and Roll's younger brother; the comic rather notoriously implies that all three characters are attracted to each other in a sexual manner. Similarly, the fourth and final issue of the Dreamwave Productions comic series included a short story with Mega Man X at the end of the issue, where X travels back in time to get help from Classic Mega Man and Dr. Light; the intention was to publish a comic based on Mega Man X, however Dreamwave shut down before any issues were released.

Characters from Mega Man X appeared twice in the Archie Comics series; the first time was during the Dawn of X arc, and the second time was during the Sonic the Hedgehog crossover Sonic and Mega Man 2: Worlds Unite.

Notes

References

 
Action video games
Capcom franchises
Science fiction video games
Side-scrolling platform games
Side-scrolling video games
Video game franchises
Video game franchises introduced in 1993